SS Bremen was a German-built ocean liner constructed for the Norddeutscher Lloyd line (NDL) to work the transatlantic sea route. Bremen was notable for her bulbous bow construction, high-speed engines, and low, streamlined profile. At the time of her construction, she and her sister ship  were the two most advanced high-speed steam turbine ocean liners of their day. The German pair sparked an international competition in the building of large, fast, luxurious ocean liners that were national symbols and points of prestige during the pre-war years of the 1930s. She held the Blue Riband, and was the fourth ship of NDL to carry the name Bremen.

History
This speed enabled Norddeutscher Lloyd to run regular weekly crossings with two ships, a feat that normally required three. It was claimed that Bremen briefly reached speeds of  during her sea trials.

Design and Construction
Bremen was built by the new German shipbuilding company Deutsche Schiff- und Maschinenbau. She was built from 7,000 tons of high-strength steel of 52 kg/m2 (500 N/m2), allowing a weight saving of some 800 tons on the structure. She was launched at Bremen during the afternoon of Thursday, 16 August 1928 by President Paul von Hindenburg, only one day after the launch of her sister ship  at Hamburg. SS Bremen and her sister ship  were considered for their time as the most modern liners in the world. The high speeds and the comfort and luxury level on board made high demands of technical personnel. Each ship required an engineering crew of some 170 men.

As on her sister ship Europa, Bremen had a catapult on the upper deck between the two funnels with a small seaplane, which facilitated faster mail service. The airplane was launched from the ship several hours before arrival, landing at the seaplane base in Blexen.

The boiler and the machine equipment were designed by Professor Dr. Gustav Bauer. Bremen had four airtight boiler rooms. The combustion air for the oil burners of the boilers was blown into the boiler rooms by eight steam turbine blowers. The resulting positive pressure meant that the boiler rooms were accessible only through airlocks. The steam was generated in 20 oil-fired water tube boilers, eleven double-enders and nine single-enders in four banks fired by a total of 227 oil burners. The maximum steam generating capacity was 500 tons/h. For harbour operation three boilers with their own blower were available, so that during work periods the main boiler airlocks could remain open.

Each of them had a high pressure, a medium pressure, low pressure and a reverse turbine. In reverse, 65% of the forward power was available. The 230 V electric power on the ship came from four diesel generators with a total output of 520 kW. On board, there were total of 420 electric motors, approximately 21,000 lamps, electric cookers and 20 elevators.

Blue Riband
Bremen was to have made her maiden transatlantic crossing in the company of her sister Europa, but Europa suffered a serious fire during fitting-out, so Bremen crossed solo, departing Bremerhaven for New York City under the command of Commodore Leopold Ziegenbein on 16 July 1929.

This voyage also marked the first time mail was carried by a ship-launched plane for delivery before the ship's arrival. A Heinkel HE 12 floatplane, flown by 27-year-old Luft Hansa pilot Baron Jobst von Studnitz, was launched at sea twenty miles east of Fire Island with 11,000 pieces of mail in six mailbags weighing  which it delivered to New York many hours before the ship docked at the North German-Lloyd pier at the foot of 58th Street in Brooklyn. The mailplane was launched on the eastbound voyage in the English Channel near Cherbourg carrying 18,000 letters to Bremerhaven where it delivered the mail many hours ahead of the ship's arrival. Bremen lost the westbound Blue Riband to her sister Europa in 1930, and the eastbound Blue Riband to Italian  in 1932.

Before World War II

As Nazism gained power in Germany, Bremen and her pier in New York were often the site of Anti-Nazi demonstrations. On 26 July 1935 a group of anti-Nazi demonstrators boarded Bremen just before she sailed and tore the Nazi flag from the jackstaff and tossed it into the Hudson River. At the time there was a dual flag law, by which both the black-white-red horizontal tricolor (previously the flag of the German Empire), and the swastika flag were simultaneously official national flags of Germany. As the ship's swastika flag was the one tossed into the river, US authorities claimed that no symbol of Germany had been harmed.

On 15 September 1935 Germany changed its flag law, removing the status of the black-white-red flag of imperial Germany, lest it be used by reactionaries. The Nazis on coming to power had used it as a co-national flag to replace the black-red-gold flag of the Weimar Republic.

Bremen started her South America cruise on 11 February 1939, and was the first ship of this size to traverse the Panama Canal. On 22 August 1939, she began her last voyage to New York. After ten years of service, she had almost 190 transatlantic voyages completed.

World War II

On 26 August 1939, in anticipation of the invasion of Poland, the Kriegsmarine high command ordered all German merchant ships to head to German ports immediately. Bremen was on a westbound crossing and two days from New York when she received the order. Bremens captain decided to continue to New York to disembark her 1,770 passengers. She left New York without passengers on 30 August 1939 and on 1 September, coincident with the start of the Second World War, she was ordered to make for the Russian port of Murmansk. Underway, her crew painted the ship grey for camouflage. She made use of bad weather and high speed to avoid Royal Navy cruisers, arriving in Murmansk on 6 September 1939. With the outbreak of the Winter War between Finland and the Soviet Union, on 10 December 1939 Bremen made a dash to Bremerhaven, arriving on 13 December. On the way she was sighted and challenged by the S-class submarine . While challenging Bremen, an escorting Dornier Do 18 seaplane forced Salmon to dive for safety. After diving, Salmons commander, Lieutenant Commander E. O. Bickford, decided not to torpedo the liner because he believed she was not a legal target. His decision not to fire on Bremen likely delayed the start of unrestricted submarine warfare.

Bremen was used as a barracks ship; there were plans to use her as a transport in Operation Sea Lion, the intended invasion of Great Britain. On 16 March 1941, Bremen was set alight by 15-year-old crew member Walter Schmidt while at her dock in Bremerhaven and completely gutted. A lengthy investigation discovered that the arson was the result of a personal grudge against one of the ship's officers, and was not an act of war. Schmidt was later guillotined for the arson, becoming one of the youngest people to be judicially executed by the regime. Starting in 1942 she was dismantled to the waterline so the steel could be used for munitions. In 1946 her remains were towed up the River Weser, beached on a sandbar off Blexen, Nordenham and destroyed by explosives, though some parts of the double hull remain visible to this day.

Legacy

In 2004, a stamp was issued showing  Bremen  before the Manhattan skyline.

In 2003, Radio Bremen produced a one-hour radio feature, Königin der Meere – Die Geschichte des Schnelldampfers "Bremen" (Queen of the Seas - The story of the rapid steamer "Bremen") by Detlef Michelers and other former sailors on Bremen.

In the stairwell in the Übersee Museum Bremen, there is a 1:100 scale model of Bremen, while in the shipping exhibit there is a model of her significantly smaller earlier namesake to the same scale.

A much larger, 39-foot long model of the Bremen, known officially as Bremen IV, Junior was built between 1949 and 1962 by enthusiasts Günter Bos and Günter Buse. The 10-ton model, operated by a two-person crew inside, would tour the world, and achieve a Guinness World Record for largest seaworthy model ship. It currently resides at Technik Museum Speyer.

View of Bremen

Further reading
 Ahrens, Adolf: Die Siegesfahrt der "Bremen". Berlin, 1939.
 Aschenbeck, Nils: Schnelldampfer Bremen – Die Legende/Express Liner Bremen – The Legend.  Delmenhorst, 1999 .
 Huchthausen, Peter A.: Shadow Voyage: The Extraordinary Wartime Escape of the Legendary S.S. Bremen, Wiley, 2005.
 Willoughby, J. Russell: Bremen & Europa - German Speed Queens of the Atlantic. Maritime Publishing Concepts 2010 .
 Nur das Gästebuch bezeugt den alten Glanz. Erinnerungen an Julius Hundt, Chief-Ingenieur der "Bremen" / Besuch an Bord war ein Erlebnis. In Weser-Kurier. Bremen, 1999.
 "Bremen"-Fotos aus privaten Alben. Bildband über den Schnelldampfer. In Weser-Kurier, Bremen, 1999.
 Hermann Haarmann / Ingrid Peckskamp-Lürßen: Mit der Kamera um die Welt – Richard Fleischhut (1881–1951). Kettler-Verlag .

References

External links
 The Great Ocean Liners: Bremen 
 The Maritime Network Article on SS Bremen
 El "BREMEN", un transatlántico notable (Spanish)
 https://web.archive.org/web/20080804013637/http://www.radiobremen.de/magazin/geschichte/schiffe/bremen/ 
 "New Catapult Drives Plane From Deck of Liner", November 1929, Popular Mechanics photo of Heinkel 12 on Bremen catapult
 Video dedicated to SS Bremen

1928 ships
B
Blue Riband holders
Maritime incidents in March 1941
Ship fires
Ships built in Bremen (state)
Ships of Norddeutscher Lloyd
Steamships of Germany
Flag controversies